The Panhandle Inn, at 301 Main St. in Panhandle, Texas, was listed on the National Register of Historic Places in 2017.

It is a  building for a hotel and other uses, designed by architect E.F. Rittenberry.  It was organized in 1924 and it operated as a hotel until 1972.

The building was on Preservation Texas' 2012 list of most endangered places.

See also

National Register of Historic Places listings in Carson County, Texas

References

Hotels in Texas
National Register of Historic Places in Carson County, Texas
Buildings and structures completed in 1924